The 2022 Toronto Blue Jays season was the 46th season of the Toronto Blue Jays franchise, and the Blue Jays’ 31st full season (33rd overall) at Rogers Centre. 

On December 2, 2021, Commissioner of Baseball Rob Manfred announced a lockout of players, following expiration of the collective bargaining agreement (CBA) between the league and the Major League Baseball Players Association (MLBPA). On March 10, 2022, the MLB and MLBPA agreed to a new collective bargaining agreement, thus ending the lockout. Opening Day was rescheduled for April 7, one week later than the original March 31 date, affecting two series for each team. 

Although MLB previously announced that any cancelled games due to the lockout would not be rescheduled, the agreement provides for a complete 162-game season. The three home games against the Tampa Bay Rays were rescheduled to be played in the Rays' two other visits, creating two five-game series, while the series at Baltimore was added to the end of the season.

On July 13, the Blue Jays dismissed manager Charlie Montoyo after starting the month 3–9. Bench coach John Schneider replaced Montoyo as interim manager. In Montoyo's four years with Toronto, he had a record of 236–236 (.500). The Jays would rebound under Schneider, going 46-28 the rest of the way, including a historic 28-5 win against the Red Sox on July 22.

On September 29, Toronto clinched their first wild card berth since the pandemic-shortened 2020 season and their first in a full season since 2016. Toronto also clinched home advantage for the wild card series, in which they were swept by the Seattle Mariners with losses of 4-0 and 10-9.

Previous season 
The Blue Jays finished the 2021 Major League Baseball season with a 91–71 record, which placed them fourth in the American League East division, missing the postseason by one win.

Offseason

Lockout 

The expiration of the league's collective bargaining agreement (CBA) with the Major League Baseball Players Association occurred on December 1, 2021 with no new agreement in place. As a result, the team owners voted unanimously to lockout the players stopping all free agency and trades. 

The parties came to an agreement on a new CBA on March 10, 2022.

Rule changes 
Pursuant to the new CBA, several new rules were instituted for the 2022 season. The National League will adopt the designated hitter full-time, a draft lottery will be implemented, the postseason will expand from ten teams to twelve, and advertising patches will appear on player uniforms and helmets for the first time.

Standings

American League East

American League Wild Card

Records vs. opponents

2022 draft
The 2022 Major League Baseball draft began on July 17. The Blue Jays gained compensation selections at the end of the second round due to Robbie Ray and Marcus Semien signing with the Seattle Mariners and Texas Rangers respectively.

Regular season

Opening Day

April

The Blue Jays opened the 2022 season at home against the Texas Rangers. After falling behind 7–0 in the fourth inning, Toronto launched the largest comeback victory on Opening Day in 72 years, winning 10–8. The Blue Jays would take the second game, 4–3, before losing the final game of the series, 12–6. The team then began its first road series of the season, taking on the New York Yankees in the Bronx. The Blue Jays won the first game of the four-game set, 3–0, and Jordan Romano earned his 26th consecutive save, breaking Tom Henke's franchise record. After dropping the second game, 4–0, the Jays took the third game 6–4, aided largely by three home runs from Vladimir Guerrero Jr. The Yankees took the final game of the series, 3–0, to split the series at two games apiece. Returning home, the Blue Jays began a three-game series against the Oakland Athletics with a 4–1 victory. The second game went into the ninth inning tied at five, until Cristian Pache hit a two-run home run to give Oakland the game 7–5. The Blue Jays won the final game, 4–3, backed by another strong performance from Alek Manoah.

Toronto began a six-game road trip in Boston the following night, where Bo Bichette's first two errors of the season helped the Red Sox to a 2–1 win. Raimel Tapia's first home run of the season paced the Jays to a 6–1 victory in the second game, and Kevin Gausman's eight shutout innings in the third and final game helped the Jays to a 3–2 win in the finale. In the first game of a three-game series against the Houston Astros, Matt Chapman's ninth-inning double drove in Vladimir Guerrero Jr. to give the Blue Jays a 4–3 victory. Santiago Espinal broke a tie in the seventh inning of the second game, giving the Jays a 3–2 win. However, the team had its four-game winning streak snapped in the final game of the series, losing 8–7 in the tenth inning. On April 25, the Blue Jays returned to Toronto to begin a ten-game homestand, starting with four games against the Red Sox. Bo Bichette's first-career grand slam in the eighth inning gave the first game to the Jays, 6–2. In the second game, Boston scored four runs in the eighth inning to take a 5–2 lead. In the ninth inning, back-to-back doubles from Raimel Tapia and Santiago Espinal scored a run, and George Springer's two-run home run tied the game at five and sent it to a tenth inning, where Tapia hit a walk-off sacrifice fly. Boston took the third game, 7–1, with manager Alex Cora returning from having COVID-19. The Blue Jays took the series victory with a 1–0 win in the final game, led by Alek Manoah's seven shutout innings. To close the month, the Jays dropped the opening game of the series against Houston 11–7, but bounced back in the second game with a 2–1 victory to end April with a 14–8 record.

May

To begin May, the Blue Jays took the final game of the three-game series against the Astros, 3–2. Ending their ten-game homestand, the Jays took on the Yankees. Toronto dropped the first two games of the series, 3–2 and 9–1 respectively, but salvaged the final game 2–1, ending the Yankees' 11-game winning streak and taking their first series loss of the 2022 season. The Blue Jays then embarked on a nine-game road trip, beginning with four against the Cleveland Guardians. Rookie Steven Kwan's first home run helped Cleveland to a 6–5 victory in the opener. The second game was rained out, and rescheduled as a doubleheader for the following day. The teams split the games, with Toronto taking the first 8–3 and Cleveland taking the second, 8–2. The Guardians took the series with a 4–3 win in the finale. After a day off, the Blue Jays were swept in a brief two-game series in New York against the Yankees. With a 1–5 record on their road trip, the Blue Jays travelled to Tampa Bay for the first time in 2022, to take on the Rays. Toronto lost the opener, 5–2, which extended their losing streak to five games and lowered their record to 17–16. The Jays ended their losing streak with a 5–1 victory in the second game, before dropping their fourth straight series with a 3–0 loss in the finale.

The Jays returned home after a dismal 2–7 road trip to take on Seattle and Cincinnati. Home runs from Bo Bichette and Matt Chapman led the Jays to a 6–2 win in the opener against the Mariners. The Jays took the second game 3–0 but were unable to complete the sweep, dropping the final game 5–1. The Blue Jays had another opportunity for a sweep, taking the first two games against Cincinnati by scores of 2–1 and 3–1, but again lost the finale, 3–2, after Toronto native Joey Votto's first home run of the season gave the Reds the lead. The Jays then travelled to St. Louis for two games against the Cardinals. Paul Goldschmidt hit a walk-off grand slam in the first game, giving the Cards a 7–3 victory. Toronto salvaged the final game of the series, 8–1, led by two home runs from Danny Jansen. After a day off, the Blue Jays travelled to Los Angeles for four games against the Angels. Vladimir Guerrero Jr., the 2021 AL MVP runner-up, hit a home run off 2021 MVP winner Shohei Ohtani in the opener, leading the Jays to a 6–3 win. The Blue Jays rallied in the ninth inning of the second game, with Lourdes Gurriel Jr.'s RBI single proving to be the difference in a 4–3 victory. The Jays entered the seventh inning of the third game down 4–1, but scored five runs and then held on to win the game 6–5. Toronto earned their first sweep of the 2022 season with an 11–10 win in the final game of the series, and closed May with their sixth consecutive win after defeating the Chicago White Sox 6–5.

Game log

|- style="background:#bfb;"
| 1 || April 8 || Rangers || 10–8 || Cimber (1–0) || Santana (0–1) || Romano (1) || 45,022 || 1–0 || –
|- style="background:#bfb;" 
| 2 || April 9 || Rangers || 4–3 || Richards (1–0) || Martin (0–1) || Romano (2) || 43,386 || 2–0 || –
|- style="background:#fbb;" 
| 3 || April 10 || Rangers || 6–12 || Burke (1–0) || Merryweather (0–1) || — || 31,549 || 2–1 || 1
|- style="background:#bfb;" 
| 4 || April 11 || @ Yankees || 3–0 || Manoah (1–0) || Taillon (0–1) || Romano (3) || 26,211 || 3–1 || –
|- style="background:#fbb;"
| 5 || April 12 || @ Yankees || 0–4 || Holmes (1–0) || Kikuchi (0–1) || — || 25,068 || 3–2 ||  1
|- style="background:#bfb;" 
| 6 || April 13 || @ Yankees || 6–4 || Cimber (2–0) || Green (0–1) || Romano (4) || 30,109 || 4–2 || –
|- style="background:#fbb;" 
| 7 || April 14 || @ Yankees || 0–3 || Severino (1–0) || Gausman (0–1) || King (1) || 37,255 || 4–3 || –
|- style="background:#bfb;"
| 8 || April 15 || Athletics || 4–1 || Cimber (3–0) || Jefferies (1–1) || Romano (5) || 35,415 || 5–3 || +1
|- style="background:#fbb;"
| 9 || April 16 || Athletics || 5–7 || Jiménez (1–0) || Merryweather (0–2) || Trivino (2) || 32,330 || 5–4 || –
|- style="background:#bfb;" 
| 10 || April 17 || Athletics || 4–3 || Manoah (2–0) || Oller (0–1) || Romano (6) || 27,490 || 6–4 || +½
|- style="background:#fbb;" 
| 11 || April 19 || @ Red Sox || 1–2 || Robles (1–0) || García (0–1) || Whitlock (1) || 31,640 || 6–5 || —
|- style="background:#bfb;" 
| 12 || April 20 || @ Red Sox || 6–1 || Berríos (1–0) || Pivetta (0–3) || — || 33,354 || 7–5 || –
|- style="background:#bfb;"
| 13 || April 21 || @ Red Sox || 3–2 || Gausman (1–1) || Houck (1–1) || Romano (7) || 35,792 || 8–5 || +1
|- style="background:#bfb;" 
| 14 || April 22 || @ Astros || 4–3 || Mayza (1–0) || Neris (1–1) || Romano (8) || 36,757 || 9–5 || +1
|- style="background:#bfb;" 
| 15 || April 23 || @ Astros || 3–2 || Manoah (3–0) || Taylor (0–1) || Cimber (1) || 36,075 || 10–5 || +1
|- style="background:#fbb;" 
| 16 || April 24 || @ Astros || 7–8  || Taylor (1–1) || Romano (0–1) || — || 39,534 || 10–6 || –
|- style="background:#bfb;"
| 17 || April 25 || Red Sox || 6–2 || Cimber (4–0) || Strahm (1–1) || — || 20,981 || 11–6 || +½
|- style="background:#bfb;"
| 18 || April 26 || Red Sox || 6–5  || Romano (1–1) || Barnes (0–1) || — || 22,611 || 12–6 || +½
|- style="background:#fbb;" 
| 19 || April 27 || Red Sox || 1–7 || Wacha (2–0) || Thornton (0–1) || — || 20,468 || 12–7 || ½
|- style="background:#bfb;" 
| 20 || April 28 || Red Sox || 1–0 || Manoah (4–0) || Whitlock (1–1) || Romano (9) || 23,144 || 13–7 || ½
|- style="background:#fbb;"
| 21 || April 29 || Astros || 7–11 || Urquidy (2–1) || Thornton (0–2) || — || 35,066 || 13–8 || 1½
|- style="background:#bfb;" 
| 22 || April 30 || Astros || 2–1 || Berríos (2–0) || García (1–1) || Romano (10) || 40,732 || 14–8 || 1½
|-

|- style="background:#bfb;" 
| 23 || May 1 || Astros || 3–2 || Gausman (2–1) || Valdez (1–2) || Romano (11) || 31,802 || 15–8 || 1½
|- style="background:#fbb;" 
| 24 || May 2 || Yankees || 2–3 || Holmes (2–0) || García (0–2) || Green (1) || 18,577 || 15–9 || 2½
|- style="background:#fbb;" 
| 25 || May 3 || Yankees || 1–9 || Taillon (2–1) || Cimber (4–1) || — || 22,491 || 15–10 || 3½
|- style="background:#bfb;"
| 26 || May 4 || Yankees || 2–1 || Kikuchi (1–1) || Cortés Jr. (1–1) || Romano (12) || 29,057 || 16–10 || 2½
|- style="background:#fbb;" 
| 27 || May 5 || @ Guardians || 5–6 || Civale (1–2) || Berríos (2–1) || Clase (5) || 9,104 || 16–11 || 3
|- style="background:#bbb;" 
| — || May 6 || @ Guardians || colspan=7| Postponed (rain); Makeup: May 7
|- style="background:#bfb;" 
| 28 || May 7  || @ Guardians || 8–3 || Gausman (3–1) || Bieber (1–2) || — ||  || 17–11 || 2½
|- style="background:#fbb;" 
| 29 || May 7  || @ Guardians || 2–8 || McKenzie (2–2) || Stripling (0–1) || — || 16,819 || 17–12 || 3
|- style="background:#fbb;" 
| 30 || May 8 || @ Guardians || 3–4 || Shaw (1–0) || Cimber (4–2) || Clase (6) || 14,787 || 17–13 || 3½
|- style="background:#fbb;" 
| 31 || May 10 || @ Yankees || 5–6 || Peralta (1–0) || Romano (1–2) || — || 41,522 || 17–14 || 5
|- style="background:#fbb;" 
| 32 || May 11 || @ Yankees || 3–5 || Taillon (3–1) || Berríos (2–2) || Chapman (8) || 42,105 || 17–15 || 6
|- style="background:#fbb;" 
| 33 || May 13 || @ Rays || 2–5 || Kittredge (3–0) || Gausman (3–2) || Adam (1) || 10,169 || 17–16 || 7½
|- style="background:#bfb;" 
| 34 || May 14 || @ Rays || 5–1 || Mayza (2–0) || Thompson (1–2) || — || 15,195 || 18–16 || 6½
|- style="background:#fbb;" 
| 35 || May 15 || @ Rays || 0–3 || Wisler (2–1) || Manoah (4–1) || Kittredge (5) || 20,832 || 18–17 || 7½
|- style="background:#bfb;" 
| 36 || May 16 || Mariners || 6–2 || Kikuchi (2–1) || Flexen (1–6) || Cimber (2) || 28,207 || 19–17 || 7½
|- style="background:#bfb;"
| 37 || May 17 || Mariners || 3–0 || Berríos (3–2) || Gilbert (4–2) || Cimber (3) || 22,988 || 20–17 || 7½
|- style="background:#fbb;"
| 38 || May 18 || Mariners || 1–5 || Gonzales (2–4) || Gausman (3–3) || — || 20,472 || 20–18 || 8½
|- style="background:#bfb;" 
| 39 || May 20 || Reds || 2–1 || Ryu (1–0) || Castillo (0–2) || Romano (13) || 29,300 || 21–18 || 7½
|- style="background:#bfb;" 
| 40 || May 21 || Reds || 3–1 || Manoah (5–1) || Cessa (2–1) || Romano (14) || 39,393 || 22–18 || 7½
|- style="background:#fbb;" 
| 41 || May 22 || Reds || 2–3 || Díaz (2–0) || García (0–3) || Warren (2) || 42,323 || 22–19 || 7
|- style="background:#fbb;" 
| 42 || May 23 || @ Cardinals || 3–7  || Cabrera (2–1) || Phelps (0–1) || — || 36,033 || 22–20 || 7
|- style="background:#bfb;" 
| 43 || May 24 || @ Cardinals || 8–1 || Gausman (4–3) || Hicks (1–4) || — || 33,797 || 23–20 || 7
|- style="background:#bfb;"
| 44 || May 26 || @ Angels || 6–3 || Ryu (2–0) || Ohtani (3–3) || — || 28,228 || 24–20 || 7½
|- style="background:#bfb;"
| 45 || May 27 || @ Angels || 4–3 || Richards (2–0) || Iglesias (1–3) || Romano (15) || 44,641 || 25–20 || 7½
|- style="background:#bfb;" 
| 46 || May 28 || @ Angels || 6–5 || Cimber (5–2) || Barraclough (0–1) || Stripling (1) || 34,005 || 26–20 || 6½
|- style="background:#bfb;" 
| 47 || May 29 || @ Angels || 11–10 || Cimber (6–2) || Quijada (0–1) || Phelps (1) || 36,568 || 27–20 || 5½
|- style="background:#bfb;"
| 48 || May 31 || White Sox || 6–5 || Gausman (5–3) || Giolito (3–2) || Romano (16) || 25,424 || 28–20 || 5½
|-

|- style="background:#bfb;" 
| 49 || June 1 || White Sox || 7–3 || Stripling (1–1) || Kopech (1–2) || — || 23,312 || 29–20 || 5
|- style="background:#bfb;" 
| 50 || June 2 || White Sox || 8–3 || Manoah (6–1) || Cueto (0–2) || — || 25,250 || 30–20 || 5½
|- style="background:#fbb;" 
| 51 || June 3 || Twins || 3–9 || Cotton (1–1) || Kikuchi (2–2) || — || 27,753 || 30–21 || 6½
|- style="background:#bfb;" 
| 52 || June 4 || Twins || 12–3 || Berríos (4–2) || Bundy (3–3) || — || 36,987 || 31–21 || 6½
|- style="background:#fbb;"
| 53 || June 5 || Twins || 6–8 || Cotton (2–1) || Gausman (5–4) || Morán (1) || 34,088 || 31–22 || 7½
|- style="background:#bfb;"
| 54 || June 6 || @ Royals || 8–0 || Stripling (2–1) || Lynch (2–5) || — || 10,889 || 32–22 || 7
|- style="background:#bfb;"
| 55 || June 7 || @ Royals || 7–0 || Manoah (7–1) || Keller (1–7) || — || 15,103 || 33–22 || 7
|- style="background:#fbb;"
| 56 || June 8 || @ Royals || 4–8 || Singer (3–1) || Richards (2–1) || — || 12,196 || 33–23 ||  7
|- style="background:#bfb;" 
| 57 || June 10 || @ Tigers || 10–1 || Berríos (5–2) || Rodríguez (0–2) || — || 26,226 || 34–23 || 7½
|- style="background:#fbb;"
| 58 || June 11 || @ Tigers || 1–3 || Brieske (1–5) || Gausman (5–5) || Soto (13) || 30,738 || 34–24 || 8½
|- style="background:#bfb;"
| 59 || June 12 || @ Tigers || 6–0 || Stripling (3–1) || Skubal (5–3) || — || 29,399 || 35–24 || 8½
|- style="background:#bfb;"
| 60 || June 13 || Orioles || 11–1 || Manoah (8–1) || Bradish (1–4) || — || 19,716 || 36–24 || 8
|- style="background:#fbb;"
| 61 || June 14 || Orioles || 5–6 || Lyles (4–5) || Kikuchi (2–3) || López (9) || 23,106 || 36–25 || 9
|- style="background:#bfb;"
| 62 || June 15 || Orioles || 7–6  || Cimber (7–2) || Bautista (2–2) || — || 19,961 || 37–25 || 9
|- style="background:#fbb;"
| 63 || June 16 || Orioles || 2–10 || Wells (4–4) || Gausman (5–6) || — || 36,832 || 37–26 || 10
|- style="background:#fbb;" 
| 64 || June 17 || Yankees || 3–12 || Montgomery (3–1) || Stripling (3–2) || — || 44,688 || 37–27 || 11
|- style="background:#fbb;" 
| 65 || June 18 || Yankees || 0–4 || Taillon (8–1) || Manoah (8–2) || — || 45,055 || 37–28 || 12
|- style="background:#bfb;" 
| 66 || June 19 || Yankees || 10–9 || García (1–3) || Peralta (1–1) || Romano (17) || 44,395 || 38–28 || 11
|- style="background:#fbb;" 
| 67 || June 20 || @ White Sox || 7–8 || Lynn (1–0) || Berríos (5–3) || Kelly (1) || 22,842 || 38–29 || 12
|- style="background:#fbb;" 
| 68 || June 21 || @ White Sox || 6–7  || Velasquez (3–3) || Gage (0–1) || — || 20,529 || 38–30 || 12
|- style="background:#bfb;" 
| 69 || June 22 || @ White Sox || 9–5 || Stripling (4–2) || Giolito (4–4) || — || 19,406 || 39–30 || 12
|- style="background:#bfb;" 
| 70 || June 24 || @ Brewers || 9–4 || Manoah (9–2) || Houser (4–8) || — || 32,166 || 40–30 || 11½
|- style="background:#fbb;"
| 71 || June 25 || @ Brewers || 4–5 || Burnes (6–4) || Kikuchi (2–4) || Hader (22) || 34,768 || 40–31 || 11½
|- style="background:#fbb;"
| 72 || June 26 || @ Brewers || 3–10 || Gustave (1–0) || Berríos (5–4) || — || 35,503 || 40–32 || 12½
|- style="background:#bfb;" 
| 73 || June 27 || Red Sox || 7–2 || Gausman (6–6) || Seabold (0–1) || — || 25,498 || 41–32 || 12½
|- style="background:#bfb;" 
| 74 || June 28 || Red Sox || 6–5 || Romano (2–2) || Danish (2–1) || — || 27,140 || 42–32 || 12½
|- style="background:#fbb;"
| 75 || June 29 || Red Sox || 5–6  || Strahm (3–2) || Phelps (0–2) || — || 27,601 || 42–33 || 13½
|- style="background:#bfb;" 
| 76 || June 30 || Rays || 4–1 || Kikuchi (3–4) || Yarbrough (0–4) || Cimber (4) || 22,987 || 43–33 || 12½
|-

|- style="background:#bfb;"
| 77 || July 1 || Rays || 9–2 || Berríos (6–4) || Kluber (3–5) || — || 44,445 || 44–33 || 12
|- style="background:#fbb;" 
| 78 || July 2 (1) || Rays || 2–6 || McClanahan (9–3) || Lawrence (0–1) || — || 39,426 || 44–34 || 13
|- style="background:#fbb;" 
| 79 || July 2 (2) || Rays || 5–11 || Garza Jr. (2–2) || Hatch (0–1) || — || 24,180 || 44–35 || 14
|- style="background:#fbb;" 
| 80 || July 3 || Rays || 3–7 || Baz (1–1) || Stripling (4–3) || Adam (3) || 35,757 || 44–36 || 14
|- style="background:#fbb;" 
| 81 || July 4 || @ Athletics || 1–5 || Irvin (3–6) || Manoah (9–3) || — || 24,403 || 44–37 || 14½
|- style="background:#fbb;" 
| 82 || July 5 || @ Athletics || 3–5 || Martínez (2–1) || Kikuchi (3–5) || Trivino (6) || 4,846 || 44–38 || 14½
|- style="background:#bfb;" 
| 83 || July 6 || @ Athletics || 2–1 || Cimber (8–2) || Acevedo (1–2) || Romano (18) || 6,330 || 45–38 || 14½
|- style="background:#fbb;"
| 84 || July 7 || @ Mariners || 3–8 || Gonzales (5–9) || Banda (1–1) || — || 24,998 || 45–39 || 15½
|- style="background:#fbb;" 
| 85 || July 8 || @ Mariners || 2–5  || Borucki (1–0) || Romo (0–1) || — || 32,398 || 45–40 || 16½
|- style="background:#fbb;"
| 86 || July 9 || @ Mariners || 1–2 || Brash (2–3) || Manoah (9–4) || Castillo (5) || 41,210 || 45–41 || 16½
|- style="background:#fbb;" 
| 87 || July 10 || @ Mariners || 5–6 || Festa (1–0) || Cimber (8–3) || Sewald (10) || 37,694 || 45–42 || 16½
|- style="background:#bfb;"
| 88 || July 12 || Phillies || 4–3 || Berríos (7–4) || Familia (1–1) || Romano (19) || 32,795 || 46–42 || 15½
|- style="background:#bfb;"
| 89 || July 13 || Phillies || 8–2 || Stripling (5–3) || Wheeler (8–5) || — || 30,853 || 47–42 || 15½
|- style="background:#fbb;"
| 90 || July 14 || Royals || 1–3 || Zerpa (2–0) || Gausman (6–7) || Barlow (16) || 24,426 || 47–43 || 15½
|- style="background:#bfb;"
| 91 || July 15 || Royals || 8–1 || Manoah (10–4) || Greinke (3–6) || — || 26,422 || 48–43 || 14½
|- style="background:#bfb;"
| 92 || July 16 || Royals || 6–5  || Romano (3–2) || Payamps (2–3) || — || 40,135 || 49–43 || 14½
|- style="background:#bfb;"
| 93 || July 17 || Royals || 4–2 || Mayza (3–0) || Mills (0–1) || Romano (20) || 36,681 || 50–43 || 14½
|- style="text-align:center; background:#bbcaff
|-style=background:#bff
|  || July 19 ||colspan="8"|92nd All-Star Game in Los Angeles, California
|- style="background:#bfb;"
| 94 || July 22 || @ Red Sox || 28–5 || Gausman (7–7) || Eovaldi (4–3) || — || 36,796 || 51–43 || 13½
|- style="background:#bfb;" 
| 95 || July 23 || @ Red Sox || 4–1 || Manoah (11–4) || Crawford (2–3) || Romano (21) || 35,821 || 52–43 || 12½
|- style="background:#bfb;"
| 96 || July 24 || @ Red Sox || 8–4 || Mayza (4–0) || Bello (0–2) || — || 34,404 || 53–43 || 12½
|- style="background:#bfb;" 
| 97 || July 26 || Cardinals || 10–3 || Mayza (5–0) || Hicks (2–5) || — || 39,756 || 54–43 ||11½
|- style="background:#fbb;"
| 98 || July 27 || Cardinals || 1–6 || Wainwright (7–8) || Gausman (7–8) || — || 36,666 || 54–44 || 11½
|- style="background:#bfb;" 
| 99 || July 28 || Tigers || 5–3 || Kikuchi (4–5) || Alexander (2–4) || Romano (22) || 27,080 || 55–44 || 11½
|- style="background:#fbb;" 
| 100 || July 29 || Tigers || 2–4 || Vest (3–2) || Manoah (11–5) || Soto (19) || 28,046 || 55–45 || 12½
|- style="background:#bfb;"
| 101 || July 30 || Tigers || 5–3 || Richards (3–1) || Law (0–1) || Romano (23) || 42,933 || 56–45 || 12½
|- style="background:#bfb;" 
| 102 || July 31 || Tigers || 4–1 || Berríos (8–4) || Hill (1–3) || Romano (24) || 40,298 || 57–45 || 11½
|-

|- style="background:#bfb;"
| 103 || August 2 || @ Rays || 3–1 || Gausman (8–8) || Rasmussen (6–4) || Romano (25) || 16,433 || 58–45 || 11
|- style="background:#fbb;"
| 104 || August 3 || @ Rays || 2–3 || Thompson (3–2) || Cimber (8–4) || Adam (5) || 14,253 || 58–46 || 11
|- style="background:#bfb;"
| 105 || August 4 || @ Twins || 9–3 || Manoah (12–5) || Pagán (3–5) || — || 39,030 || 59–46 || 10½
|- style="background:#fbb;"
| 106 || August 5 || @ Twins || 5–6  || Fulmer (4–4) || Romano (3–3) || — || 29,593 || 59–47 || 10½
|- style="background:#fbb;" 
| 107 || August 6 || @ Twins || 3–7 || Megill (3–1) || White (1–3) || — || 27,471 || 59–48 || 10½
|- style="background:#bfb;"
| 108 || August 7 || @ Twins || 3–2  || Romano (4–3) || Thielbar (2–1) || — || 26,155 || 60–48 || 9½
|- style="background:#fbb;"
| 109 || August 8 || @ Orioles || 4–7 || Lyles (9–8) || Kikuchi (4–6) || Bautista (5) || 12,671 || 60–49 || 10½
|- style="background:#fbb;"
| 110 || August 9 || @ Orioles || 5–6 || Vespi (4–0) || García (1–4) || Bautista (6) || 11,080 || 60–50 || 10½
|- style="background:#bbb;" 
| — || August 10 || @ Orioles || colspan=7| Postponed (rain); Makeup: September 5
|- style="background:#fbb;"
| 111 || August 12 || Guardians || 0–8 || Quantrill (9–5) || Berríos (8–5) || — || 41,677 || 60–51 || 10
|- style="background:#bfb;"
| 112 || August 13 || Guardians || 2–1 || Bass (3–3) || McKenzie (8–9) || Romano (26) || 44,977 || 61–51 || 10
|- style="background:#fbb;"
| 113 || August 14 || Guardians || 2–7 || Bieber (8–6) || Gausman (8–9) || — || 41,002 || 61–52 || 10
|- style="background:#fbb;"
| 114 || August 15 || Orioles || 3–7 || Baker (4–3) || Kikuchi (4–7) || — || 26,769 || 61–53 || 10
|- style="background:#fbb;"
| 115 || August 16 || Orioles || 2–4 || Kremer (5–4) || Manoah (12–6) || Bautista (7) || 37,940 || 61–54 || 10
|- style="background:#bfb;"
| 116 || August 17 || Orioles || 6–1 || García (2–4) || Krehbiel (4–4) || — || 40,141 || 62–54 || 10
|- style="background:#bfb;"
| 117 || August 18 || @ Yankees || 9–2 || Berríos (9–5) || Montas (4–10) || — || 41,419 || 63–54 || 9
|- style="background:#bfb;"
| 118 || August 19 || @ Yankees || 4–0 || Gausman (9–9) || Taillon (11–4) || — || 46,194 || 64–54 || 8
|- style="background:#bfb;"
| 119 || August 20 || @ Yankees || 5–2 || Cimber (9–4) || Cole (9–6) || García (1) || 45,538 || 65–54 || 7
|- style="background:#fbb;"
| 120 || August 21 || @ Yankees || 2–4 || Trivino (2–7) || Cimber (9–5) || — || 46,958 || 65–55 || 8
|- style="background:#bfb;"
| 121 || August 23 || @ Red Sox || 9–3 || Stripling (6–3) || Winckowski (5–7) || — || 30,963 || 66–55 || 8½
|- style="background:#bfb;"
| 122 || August 24 || @ Red Sox || 3–2  || Cimber (10–5) || Brasier (0–3) || Romano (27) || 31,840 || 67–55 || 8
|- style="background:#bfb;"
| 123 || August 25 || @ Red Sox || 6–5  || Romano (5–3) || Schreiber (3–3) || — || 30,527 || 68–55 || 8
|- style="background:#fbb;"
| 124 || August 26 || Angels || 0–12 || Detmers (5–4) || White (1–4) || — || 40,754 || 68–56 || 9
|- style="background:#fbb;"
| 125 || August 27 || Angels || 0–2 || Ohtani (11–8) || Manoah (12–7) || Herget (3) || 45,311 || 68–57 || 9
|- style="background:#fbb;"
| 126 || August 28 || Angels || 3–8 || Wantz (2–0) || Stripling (6–4) || — || 44,318 || 68–58 || 9
|- style="background:#bfb;"
| 127 || August 29 || Cubs || 5–4  || García (3–4) || Leiter Jr. (2–6) || — || 26,473 || 69–58 || 8
|- style="background:#bfb;"
| 128 || August 30 || Cubs || 5–3 || Gausman (10–9) || Little (0–1) || Romano (28) || 33,759 || 70–58 || 8
|- style="background:#fbb;"
| 129 || August 31 || Cubs || 5–7 || Rodríguez (1–0) || White (1–5) || Wick (9) || 28,572 || 70–59 || 8
|-

|- style="background:#bfb;"
| 130 || September 2 || @ Pirates || 4–0 || Manoah (13–7) || Beede (1–5) || — || 18,057 || 71–59 || 7
|- style="background:#bfb;" 
| 131 || September 3 || @ Pirates || 4–1 || García (4–4) || Underwood Jr. (1–4) || Romano (29) || 23,568 || 72–59 || 6
|- style="background:#bfb;" 
| 132 || September 4 || @ Pirates || 4–3 || Stripling (7–4) || Underwood Jr. (1–5) || Romano (30) || 14,903 || 73–59 || 6
|- style="background:#bfb;" 
| 133 || September 5  || @ Orioles || 7–3 || Gausman (11–9) || Baumann (1–3) || — ||  || 74–59 || 6
|- style="background:#bfb;"
| 134 || September 5  || @ Orioles || 8–4 || Berríos (10–5) || Akin (3–2) || — || 25,451 || 75–59 || 5½
|- style="background:#fbb;"
| 135 || September 6 || @ Orioles || 6–9 || Tate (4–3) || White (1–6) || Bautista (12) || 8,411 || 75–60 || 6
|- style="background:#bfb;"
| 136 || September 7 || @ Orioles || 4–1 || Manoah (14–7) || Kremer (6–5) || Romano (31) || 11,488 || 76–60 || 6½
|- style="background:#bfb;"
| 137 || September 9 || @ Rangers || 4–3 || Mayza (6–0) || Leclerc (0–2) || Romano (32) || 21,329 || 77–60 || 5
|- style="background:#bfb;"
| 138 || September 10 || @ Rangers || 11–7 || Gausman (12–9) || Arihara (1–3) || Mayza (1) || 28,340 || 78–60 || 5
|- style="background:#fbb;" 
| 139 || September 11 || @ Rangers || 1–4 || Pérez (11–6) || Richards (3–2) || Leclerc (4) || 20,984 || 78–61 || 6
|- style="background:#bfb;"
| 140 || September 12 || Rays || 3–2 || Mayza (7–0) || Adam (2–3) || Romano (33) || 23,002 || 79–61 || 5½
|- style="background:#fbb;"
| 141 || September 13 (1) || Rays || 2–4 || Springs (8–4) || Merryweather (0–3) || Fairbanks (7) || 23,497 || 79–62 || 6½
|- style="background:#bfb;"
| 142 || September 13 (2) || Rays || 7–2 || Bass (4–3) || Poche (4–2) || — || 25,103 || 80–62 || 6
|- style="background:#bfb;" 
| 143 || September 14 || Rays || 5–1 || Stripling (8–4) || Rasmussen (10–5) || — || 24,282 || 81–62 || 6
|- style="background:#fbb;" 
| 144 || September 15 || Rays || 0–11 || McClanahan (12–5) || Gausman (12–10) || — || 23,820 || 81–63 || 6½
|- style="background:#bfb;" 
| 145 || September 16 || Orioles || 6–3 || Kikuchi (5–7) || Lyles (10–11) || — || 36,573 || 82–63 || 5½
|- style="background:#bfb;" 
| 146 || September 17 || Orioles || 6–3 || Berríos (11–5) || Bradish (3–7) || Romano (34) || 44,448 || 83–63 || 4½
|- style="background:#fbb;"
| 147 || September 18 || Orioles || 4–5 || Krehbiel (5–4) || Romano (5–4) || Bautista (14) || 41,301 || 83–64 || 5½
|- style="background:#bfb;" 
| 148 || September 20 || @ Phillies || 18–11 || Pop (3–0) || Gibson (10–7) || — || 21,129 || 84–64 || 5½
|- style="background:#fbb;" 
| 149 || September 21 || @ Phillies || 3–4  || Bellatti (4–3) || Cimber (10–6) || — || 29,363 || 84–65 || 6½
|- style="background:#fbb;" 
| 150 || September 22 || @ Rays || 5–10 || Yarbrough (3–8) || Berríos (11–6) || — || 8,799 || 84–66 || 7½
|- style="background:#fbb;" 
| 151 || September 23 || @ Rays || 6–10 || Guerra (1–0) || García (4–5) || — || 17,407 || 84–67 || 8½
|- style="background:#bfb;" 
| 152 || September 24 || @ Rays || 3–1 || Manoah (15–7) || Rasmussen (10–7) || Romano (35) || 22,169 || 85–67 || 8½
|- style="background:#bfb;"
| 153 || September 25 || @ Rays || 7–1 || Stripling (9–4) || McClanahan (12–7) || — || 16,394 || 86–67 || 8½
|- style="background:#bfb;" 
| 154 || September 26 || Yankees || 3–2  || Mayza (8–0) || Schmidt (5–5) || — || 34,307 || 87–67 || 7½
|- style="background:#fbb;"
| 155 || September 27 || Yankees || 2–5 || Taillon (14–5) || Berríos (11–7) || Trivino (11) || 40,528 || 87–68 || 8½
|- style="background:#fbb;" 
| 156 || September 28 || Yankees || 3–8 || Cole (13–7) || Mayza (8–1) || — || 37,008 || 87–69 || 9½
|- style="background:#bfb;"
| 157 || September 30 || Red Sox || 9–0 || Manoah (16–7) || Pivetta (10–12) || Kikuchi (1) || 37,283 || 88–69 || 8½
|-

|- style="background:#bfb;" 
| 158 || October 1 || Red Sox || 10–0 || Stripling (10–4) || Bello (2–8) || — || 44,612 || 89–69 || 8½
|- style="background:#bfb;" 
| 159 || October 2 || Red Sox || 6–3 || Pop (4–0) || Wacha (11–2) || Romano (36) || 43,877 || 90–69 || 7½
|- style="background:#bfb;" 
| 160 || October 3 || @ Orioles || 5–1  || Berríos (12–7) || Kremer (8–7) || Mayza (2) || 10,642 || 91–69 || 7½
|- style="background:#bbb;" 
| — || October 4 || @ Orioles || colspan=7| Postponed (rain); Makeup: October 5
|- style="background:#fbb;" 
| 161 || October 5  || @ Orioles || 4–5 || Hall (1–1) || White (1–7) || Baker (1) ||  || 91–70 || 8
|- style="background:#bfb;"
| 162 || October 5  || @ Orioles || 5–1 || Kikuchi (6–7) || Canó (1–1) || — || 17,248 || 92–70 || 7
|-

Postseason

American League Wild Card Series 
As the wild card team with best record, the fourth-seeded Blue Jays won the right to host all games against the fifth-seeded Seattle Mariners in a best-of-three Wild Card series, where they were swept 2–0. It was the first Wild Card series for both franchises under the expanded format adopted this season.

On the day preceding game one, Toronto mayor John Tory declared October 7 'Blue Jays Day', in a ceremony that included the raising of a team flag at Toronto City Hall.

Postseason Game log

|-  style="text-align:center; background:#fbb;"
| 1 || October 7 || Mariners || 0–4 || Castillo (1–0) || Manoah (0–1) || — || 47,402 || 0–1
|-  style="text-align:center; background:#fbb;"
| 2 || October 8 || Mariners || 9–10 || Muñoz (1–0) || Romano (0–1) || Kirby (1) || 47,156 || 0–2
|-

Postseason rosters

| style="text-align:left" |
Pitchers: 6 Alek Manoah 16 Yusei Kikuchi 17 José Berríos 33 Trevor Richards 34 Kevin Gausman 35 David Phelps 48 Ross Stripling 52 Anthony Bass 56 Zach Pop 58 Tim Mayza 68 Jordan Romano 90 Adam Cimber 93 Yimi García 
Catchers: 9 Danny Jansen 30 Alejandro Kirk 55 Gabriel Moreno 
Infielders: 1 Whit Merrifield 5 Santiago Espinal 8 Cavan Biggio 11 Bo Bichette 26 Matt Chapman 27 Vladimir Guerrero Jr.   
Outfielders: 4 George Springer 15 Raimel Tapia 25 Jackie Bradley Jr. 37 Teoscar Hernández
|- valign="top"

Statistics

Batting
Note: G = Games played; AB = At bats; R = Runs scored; H = Hits; 2B = Doubles; 3B = Triples; HR = Home runs; RBI = Runs batted in; SB = Stolen bases; BB = Walks; AVG = Batting average; Ref. = Reference

Pitching
Note: G = Games played; GS = Games started; W = Wins; L = Losses; SV = Saves; ERA = Earned run average; WHIP = Walks plus hits per inning pitched; IP = Innings pitched; H = Hits allowed; R = Runs allowed; ER = Earned runs allowed; BB = Walks allowed; K = Strikeouts; Ref. = Reference

Transactions

April
 On April 7, selected the contract of Gosuke Katoh, and recalled Zack Collins.
 On April 8, traded Anthony Castro to the Cleveland Guardians for Bradley Zimmer.
 On April 10, activated Bradley Zimmer, and optioned Gosuke Katoh to Triple-A Buffalo.
 On April 11, optioned Tayler Saucedo to Triple-A Buffalo, designated Josh Palacios for assignment, placed Danny Jansen on the 10-day injured list, recalled Anthony Kay, and selected the contract of Tyler Heineman.
 On April 14, placed Teoscar Hernández on the 10-day injured list and recalled Gosuke Katoh.
 On April 17, placed Hyun-jin Ryu on the 10-day injured list and activated Ryan Borucki.
 On April 21, optioned Anthony Kay, and recalled Tayler Saucedo.
 On April 25, placed Cavan Biggio on the 10-day injured list and recalled Bowden Francis.
 On April 27, placed Ryan Borucki on the 10-day injured list and recalled Andrew Vasquez.
 On April 29, optioned Bowden Francis to Triple-A Buffalo and selected the contract of Vinny Capra.
 On April 30, placed Tayler Saucedo on the 10-day injured list and recalled Bowden Francis.

May
 On May 2, optioned Bowden Francis and Gosuke Katoh.
 On May 3, sent Teoscar Hernández on a rehab assignment to the Single-A Dunedin Blue Jays.
 On May 4, optioned Andrew Vasquez, designated Gosuke Katoh for assignment, and selected the contract of Casey Lawrence.
 On May 5, sent Hyun-jin Ryu on rehab assignment.
 On May 7, optioned Julian Merryweather to Triple-A Buffalo and activated Ryan Borucki and Teoscar Hernández.
 On May 8, optioned Casey Lawrence to Triple-A Buffalo.
 On May 10, sent Cavan Biggio on rehab assignment to the Triple-A Buffalo Bisons and Danny Jansen on rehab assignment to the Single-A Dunedin Blue Jays.
 On May 14, optioned Tyler Heineman and Trent Thornton to Triple-A Buffalo, and activated Danny Jansen and Hyun-jin Ryu.
 On May 16, optioned Cavan Biggio to Triple-A Buffalo, recalled Andrew Vasquez, and placed Tim Mayza on 15-day injured list.
 On May 23, optioned Zack Collins to Triple-A Buffalo and recalled Julian Merryweather.
 On May 26, optioned Vinny Capra to Triple-A Buffalo, recalled Cavan Biggio, and sent Nate Pearson on a rehab assignment to the Single-A Dunedin Blue Jays.
 On May 31, designated Ryan Borucki for assignment, and recalled Trent Thornton.

June
 On June 1, sent Nate Pearson on a rehab assignment to the Triple-A Buffalo Bisons.
 On June 2, placed Hyun-jin Ryu on the 15-day injured list and selected the contract of Jeremy Beasley.
 On June 4, traded Ryan Borucki to the Seattle Mariners for Tyler Keenan.
 On June 6, optioned Jeremy Beasley, transferred Nate Pearson to the 60-day injured list, and selected the contract of Matt Gage.
 On June 7, placed Danny Jansen on the 10-day injured list and recalled Zack Collins.
 On June 8, sent Tim Mayza on a rehab assignment to the Triple-A Buffalo Bisons.
 On June 10, placed Andrew Vasquez on the 15-day injured list and recalled Jeremy Beasley.
 On June 11, optioned Zack Collins and Jeremy Beasley, recalled Gabriel Moreno, and activated Tim Mayza.
 On June 14, recalled Jeremy Beasley, sent Taylor Saucedo on  a rehab assignment to the FCL Blue Jays, placed Julian Merryweather on the 15-day injured list and signed free agent Andrew Moore to a minor league contract.
 On June 17, optioned Matt Gage, recalled Casey Lawrence and Otto Lopez.
 On June 18, outrighted Bowden Francis to the Triple-A Buffalo Bisons, recalled Matt Gage, placed Trevor Richards on the 15-day injured list and sent Taylor Saucedo on a rehab assignment to the Triple-A Buffalo Bisons.
 On June 19, selected the contract of Max Castillo
 On June 24, recalled Jeremy Beasley and placed Yimi Garcia on the 15-day injured list.
 On June 25, optioned Otto Lopez and recalled Zack Collins.
 On June 27, optioned Jeremy Beasley, selected the contract of Shaun Anderson and transferred Hyun-jin Ryu from the 15-day injured list to the 60-day injured list.
 On June 29, optioned Shaun Anderson, placed Taylor Saucedo on the 60-day injured list, signed and activated free agent Sergio Romo.
 On June 30, sent Trevor Richards on a rehab assignment to the Triple-A Buffalo Bisons.

July
 On July 2, acquired Anthony Banda from Pittsburgh for cash, recalled Casey Lawrence and Thomas Hatch and transferred Julian Merryweather from the 15-day injured list to the 60-day injured list.
 On July 3, optioned Thomas Hatch, Max Castillo and Casey Lawrence and activated Trevor Richards.
 On July 4, optioned Matt Gage, activated Anthony Banda, sent Danny Jansen and Yimi Garcia on a rehab assignment to the Triple-A Buffalo Bisons.
 On July 5, traded Leonel Callez to Atlanta.
 On July 6, claimed Matt Peacock off waivers from Kansas City, optioned Trent Thornton, recalled Casey Lawrence and designated Shaun Anderson for assignment.
 On July 7, optioned Matt Peacock, recalled Max Castillo and placed Yusei Kikuchi on the 15-day injured list.
 On July 8, optioned Casey Lawrence and activated Yimi Garcia.
 On July 9, outrighted Shaun Anderson to the Triple-A Buffalo Bisons.
 On July 12, optioned Gabriel Moreno, activated Danny Jansen and signed free agent Colton Shaver to a minor league contract.
 On July 16, traded Jonatan Bernal to Kansas City for Foster Griffin; recalled Jeremy Beasley, optioned Foster Griffin and designated Sergio Romo for assignment.
 On July 19, outrighted Sergio Romo to the Triple-A Buffalo Bisons.
 On July 22, sent Yusei Kikuchi on a rehab assignment to the Triple-A Buffalo Bisons.
 On July 23, sent Andrew Vasquez on a rehab assignment to the Rookie FCL Blue Jays.
 On July 26, signed Michael Turconi, Brandon Barriera, Cade Doughty, T.J. Brock, Devereaux Harrison, Peyton Williams, Josh Kasevich, Ian Churchill, Bo Bonds, Ryan Jennings, Ryan Chasse, Dylan Rock, Nolan Perry, Alan Roden, Tucker Toman, Sammy Hernandez, Pat Gallagher, Mason Fluharty; and signed Vinny Nittoli, Alex Amalfi, Devonte Brown, and Ryan McCarty to minor league contracts.
 On July 27, sent Andrew Vasquez on a rehab assignment to the Triple-A Buffalo Bisons.
 On July 28, optioned Jeremy Beasley.
 On July 29, signed free agents Kelsey Ward and Jerry Huntzinger to minor league contracts.
 On July 30, optioned Max Castillo and recalled Trent Thornton.
 On July 31, placed Ross Stripling on the 15-day injured list.

August
 On August 2, acquired Whit Merrifield from the Kansa City Royals for Max Castillo and Samad Taylor; acquired Mitch White and Alex De Jesus from the Los Angeles Dodgers for Nick Frasso and LHP Moises Brito; acquired Zach Pop, Anthony Bass and Player To Be Named Later from Miami Marlins for Jordan Groshans; traded RHP Jeremy Beasley to Pittsburgh Pirates for cash; recalled Matt Gage; designated Anthony Banda for assignment; reassigned Mitch White and Whit Merrifield to the minor leagues; signed free agents Ramon Suarez and Felipe Bello to minor league contracts.
 On August 3, recalled Matt Peacock, and optioned Mitch White.
 On August 4, activated Zach Pop, Whit Merrifield, Anthony Bass; optioned Zack Collins, Matt Gage, and Matt Peacock; and signed free agent Kevin Miranda to a minor league contract.
 On August 5, outrighted Anthony Banda to the Triple-A Buffalo Bisons.
 On August 6, placed George Springer on the 10-day injured list; optioned Trent Thornton; recalled Otto Lopez and Mitch White from Buffalo Bisons; sent Julian Merryweather on a rehab assignment to the Rookie FCL Blue Jays; signed free agent Juanmi Vasquez to a minor league contract.
 On August 7, placed Tim Mayza on the 15-day injured list and recalled Trent Thornton.
 On August 9, sent Julian Merryweather on a rehab assignment to Single-A Dunedin Blue Jays; signed free agent CF Jackie Bradley Jr; designated RHP Matt Peacock for assignment; and optioned SS Otto Lopez.
 On August 11, sent Julian Merryweather on a rehab assignment to the Triple-A Buffalo Bisons.
 On August 12, sent Ross Stripling on a rehab assignment to the Triple-A Buffalo Bisons, signed free agent Lluveres Severino to a minor league contract, outrighted Matt Peacock to the Triple-A Buffalo Bisons.
 On August 15, designated Bradley Zimmer for assignment and activated George Springer from the 10-day injured list.
 On August 16, signed free agent Yoshi Tsutsugo to a minor league contract.
 On August 17, activated Ross Stripling from the 15-day injured list and optioned Trent Thornton to Buffalo Bisons.
 On August 20, sent Tim Mayza on a rehab assignment to the Triple-A Buffalo Bisons.
 On August 23, activated Tim Mayza from the 15-day injured list and optioned Zach Pop.
 On August 26, sent Tayler Saucedo on a rehab assignment to the Triple-A Buffalo Bisons.
 On August 29, claimed Bradley Zimmer off waivers from the Philadelphia Phillies.
 On August 31, traded Vinny Nittoli to Philadelphia Phillies for Karl Ellison.

September
 On September 1, recalled Casey Lawrence and activated Bradley Zimmer.
 On September 4, sent Nate Pearson on a rehab assignment to the Single-A Dunedin Blue Jays.
 On September 5, Toronto Blue Jays activated Julian Merryweather from the 60-day injured list, designated Zack Collins for assignment, optioned Casey Lawrence and recalled Zach Pop.
 On September 6, returned Zach Pop to Triple-A Buffalo Bisons.
 On September 7, placed Teoscar Hernandez on the paternity list; recalled Zach Pop and Gabriel Moreno; optioned Mitch White; and signed free agent Eric Stamets to a minor league contract.
 On September 8, sent Nate Pearson on a rehab assignment to the Triple-A Buffalo Bisons.
 On September 9, placed Lourdes Gurriel Jr. on the 10-day injured list and recalled Otto Lopez.
 On September 10, placed Teoscar Hernandez on the restricted list.
 On September 11, activated Teoscar Hernandez from the restricted list and optioned Otto Lopez.
 On September 13, recalled Mitch White.
 On September 14, optioned Mitch White.
 On September 21, optioned Julian Merryweather and recalled Foster Griffin.
 On September 22, placed Santiago Espinal on the 10-day injured list and recalled Otto Lopez.
 On September 23, optioned Foster Griffin and recalled Mitch White.

October
 On October 5, placed Vinny Capra on the 60-day injured list; activated Nate Pearson from the 60-day injured list optioned Nate Pearson; optioned Mitch White; recalled Trent Thornton, Vinny Capra and Casey Lawrence.

Roster

Farm system

Notes

References

External links
2022 Toronto Blue Jays at Baseball Reference

Toronto Blue Jays seasons
Toronto Blue Jays
Toronto Blue Jays
Toronto Blue Jays